Chill out may refer to:

Music
Chill out music, a laid-back style of music

Albums
Chill Out (Black Uhuru album) 1982
Chill Out (John Lee Hooker album) 1995
Chill Out (KLF album) 1990
COW / Chill Out, World!, 2016 album by The Orb

Songs
"Chill Out", song by Black Uhuru from Chill Out 1982
"Chill Out", song by John Lee Hooker from Chill Out 1995
"Chill Out", song by Ray BLK
"Chill-Out!, song by Fat Larry's Band 1986

See also
Chilling effect (disambiguation)
Chilled 1991-2008